The Coal Miners' Museum is a museum in Van Lear, Kentucky dedicated to the area's coal mining history . The museum is administered by the Van Lear Historical Society.

History

The museum was originally built in 1913 to serve as the  Consolidation Coal Company's (Consol) office for Van Lear. Along with Consol's office, the building also contained several businesses and has even housed Van Lear's city hall. After the building was abandoned, Citizens National Bank eventually purchased it and in 1984 it was given to the Van Lear Historical Society. The historical society then established the Coal Miners' Museum.

Exhibits

 Coal mining tools.
 Veteran's Wall of Fame.
 A documentary of Van Lear during the 1930s.
 Model of Van Lear.
 Displays showing the community during the boom years.
 Icky's 1950s soda fountain.
 Replica of the old post office.
 Replica of the old doctor's office.

References

External links
Van Lear Historical Society
Coal Miner's Museum MySpace Page
Paintsville Tourism

Museums in Johnson County, Kentucky
History museums in Kentucky
Mining museums in Kentucky
Office buildings completed in 1913
Museums established in 1984
1984 establishments in Kentucky
Coal museums in the United States